New Providence (1956–1981) is a Thoroughbred racehorse who in 1959 became the first official winner of the Canadian Triple Crown.

Retired to stud duty at owner E. P. Taylor's Windfields Farm in Oshawa, Ontario, New Providence sired a number of good runners of which his daughter South Ocean, a Canadian Oaks winner, would prove to be the most significant. A Canadian Hall of Fame inductee herself, South Ocean was the dam of Canadian Hall of Fame inductees Northernette and Storm Bird, the latter in turn the sire of Storm Cat.

New Providence died in 1981 and is buried at Windfields Farm. In 1982 he was inducted into the Canadian Horse Racing Hall of Fame and Woodbine Racetrack created the New Providence Stakes in his honour.

External links
 New Providence's pedigree and stats

References

 Cauz, Louis E. The Plate (1984) Deneau Publishers 

1956 racehorse births
1981 racehorse deaths
Racehorses bred in Ontario
Racehorses trained in Canada
King's Plate winners
Canadian Horse Racing Hall of Fame inductees
Triple Crown of Thoroughbred Racing winners
Thoroughbred family 9-d